Sphenomorphus celebensis  is a species of skink found in Indonesia.

References

celebensis
Reptiles described in 1894
Taxa named by Fritz Müller (doctor)
Reptiles of Sulawesi